First-seeded Dorothy Round defeated Nancy Lyle 1–6, 6–1, 6–3, in the final to win the women's singles tennis title at the 1935 Australian Championships. The final was the first not to feature an Australian player and is the only all British final in the championship's history.

Seeds
The seeded players are listed below. Dorothy Round is the champion; others show the round in which they were eliminated.

 Dorothy Round (champion)
n/a
 Emily Hood Westacott (semifinals)
 Nancy Lyle (finalist)
 Evelyn Dearman (quarterfinals)
 Louie Bickerton (quarterfinals)
 Nell Hopman (semifinals)
 May Blick (quarterfinals)

Draw

Key
 Q = Qualifier
 WC = Wild card
 LL = Lucky loser
 r = Retired

Finals

Earlier rounds

Section 1

Section 2

Notes

References

External links
 

1935 in women's tennis
1935
1935 in Australian tennis
1935 in Australian women's sport
Women's Singles